Budziska is a village in the administrative district of Gmina Adamów, within Łuków County, Lublin Voivodeship, in eastern Poland. The village has a population of 290.

In the Polish-Lithuanian Commonwealth it belonged to Stężyca Land in Sandomierz Voivodeship. In 1569 the village was a part of Łysobyki parish. According to a tax register from the 16th century, Stanisław Sobieski paid tax there for 14 half-łans and Jan Sobieski paid tax for 16 half-łans, one farmer and a folwark. By the end of the 19th century it had 29 houses and 259 inhabitants.

References

Villages in Łuków County